Arginyl-tRNA synthetase, cytoplasmic is an enzyme that in humans is encoded by the RARS gene.

Aminoacyl-tRNA synthetases catalyze the aminoacylation of tRNA by their cognate amino acid. Because of their central role in linking amino acids with nucleotide triplets contained in tRNAs, aminoacyl-tRNA synthetases are thought to be among the first proteins that appeared in evolution. Arginyl-tRNA synthetase belongs to the class-I aminoacyl-tRNA synthetase family.

Genetics
Mutations in RARS cause hypomyelination.

Interactions 

RARS (gene) has been shown to interact with QARS.

References

Further reading

External links